Lee Toong Leon, better known as Leon Lee, is a Malaysian businessperson  in Penang, Kuala Lumpur, Malaysia who received the Distinguished Conduct Medal (Pingat Kelakuan Terpuji) in 2016 and the Meritorious Service Medal (Pingat Jasa Kebaktian) in 2010 by Penang State Governor, Tun Abdul Rahman Abbas for his services to the state.

References

Living people
People from Penang
Year of birth missing (living people)
Malaysian businesspeople
Malaysian business executives
Malaysian people of Chinese descent